Bull Branch is a  long 1st order tributary to Richardson Creek in Union County, North Carolina.

Course
Bull Branch rises about 2 miles northeast of Wingate, North Carolina and then flows northwest to join Richardson Creek about 2 miles southwest of Watson.

Watershed
Bull Branch drains  of area, receives about 48.3 in/year of precipitation, has a wetness index of 405.73, and is about 39% forested.

References

Rivers of North Carolina
Rivers of Union County, North Carolina